McCondy, also spelled as McCandy, is an unincorporated community in Chickasaw County, Mississippi, United States.

History
McCondy was one of the first areas settled in Chickasaw County and was named for the first postmaster, Andrew McCondy. McCondy moved to the area from Scotland.

A post office first began operation under the name McCondy in 1880.

McCondy was home to a school from 1872 to 1949.

References

Unincorporated communities in Chickasaw County, Mississippi
Unincorporated communities in Mississippi